Moses Pelham (born 24 February 1971 in Frankfurt) is a German rapper, singer and producer.

In 1993, together with Thomas Hofmann in Frankfurt, he started the Rödelheim Hartreim Projekt. Pelham is a member of the German band Glashaus. In 2019, in a lawsuit against the German band Kraftwerk, Pelham lost a groundbreaking in the European Court of Justice for unauthorised sampling. The ruling means that samples which are recognisable infringe copyright law where no permission has been sought from the rightsholder. However, there is no infringement if the sample is unrecognisable. The case was referred back to the German court who gave the final decision. The German court decided that the sample was recognisable, and therefore ultimately, Pelham lost his 20 year legal saga.

Works

Albums 
 1989: Raining Rhymes
 1992: The Bastard Lookin' 4 the Light (1992 produced, but first published in 2000)
 1994: Rödelheim Hartreim Projekt – Direkt aus Rödelheim (with Thomas Hofmann)
 1995: Rödelheim Hartreim Projekt – Live aus Rödelheim (with Thomas Hofmann)
 1996: Rödelheim Hartreim Projekt – Zurück nach Rödelheim (with Thomas Hofmann)
 1998: Geteiltes Leid I
 2004: Geteiltes Leid II
 2012: Geteiltes Leid III
 2017: Herz
 2020: Emuna
 2021: Nostalgie Tape

Singles 
 1988: Ay-Ay-Ay (What We Do for Love) (with Rico Sparx)
 1988: Twilight Zone
 1989: Can This Be Love
 1989: Raining Rhymes
 1990: Muscles (with Harold Faltermeyer)
 1998: Hartreim Saga
 1998: Schnaps für alle
 1999: Skillz (with Illmat!c & Xavier Naidoo)
 1999: Mein Glück
 2000: Bonnie & Clyde 2000 (with Cora E.)
 2004: Ein schöner Tag
 2004: 77 Minutes of Strugglin (with Illmat!c & Kool Savas)
 2006: Gott liebt mich
 2009: Strugglin' (2009 ISAS Remix) (with Illmat!c, Kool Savas & Cassandra Steen)
 2012: Für die Ewigkeit
 2019: Notaufnahme
 2020: Weiße Fahne
 2020: Wunder (with Faiz Mangat)
 2020: Juli
 2020: Emuna (acoustic) (with Stefanie Kloß)
 2020: Backstein
 2020: Du
 2021: Lappen wie Du

References

External links 
 ImGlashaus.de (in German)

 Website by Moses Pelham
 Stadt Frankfurt am Main zeichnet Moses Pelham mit der Goetheplakette aus (in German)
 Spiegel.de: Moses Pelham und Kratwerk vor Gericht, Eugh Urteil zu Sampling, Sampling ist gestattet (in German)

Living people
1974 births
Musicians from Frankfurt
German rappers
21st-century German  male singers
German record producers
German people of African-American descent